Wyeth, LLC was an American pharmaceutical company. The company was founded in Philadelphia, Pennsylvania, in 1860 as John Wyeth and Brother. It was later known, in the early 1930s, as American Home Products, before being renamed to Wyeth in 2002. Its headquarters moved to Collegeville, Pennsylvania and Madison, New Jersey, before they were consolidated with Pfizer's in New York City after acquisition in 2009. Most of Wyeth's pharmaceutical assets were acquired by Pfizer in 2009, while its infant and maternal nutrition business was acquired by Nestlé in 2012.

Wyeth manufactured over-the-counter drugs (OTCs) Robitussin and the analgesic Advil (ibuprofen) as well as prescription drugs Premarin and Effexor.

History

1860–1899
In 1860, pharmacists John (1834–1907) and Frank Wyeth opened a drugstore with a small research lab on Walnut Street in Philadelphia. In 1862, on the suggestion of doctors, they began to manufacture large quantities of commonly ordered medicines. They were successful, and in 1864 they began supplying medicines and beef extract to the Union army during the Civil War.

In 1872, Henry Bowers, an employee of Wyeth, developed one of the first rotary compressed tablet machines in the United States. This enabled the mass production of medicines with unprecedented precision and speed. It was successful, and the Wyeth brothers won multiple awards at the Centennial Exhibition. In 1883, Wyeth opened its first international facility in Montreal, Canada, and began vaccine production. Six years later a fire destroyed the brothers' original Walnut Street store, and they sold the retail business and focused on mass production. Cobalt blue glass bottles embossed with either "Wyeth" or "John Wyeth & Brother" in the glass are among the most popular antique bottles sought after by collectors.

1900–1929
John Wyeth died in 1907 and his only son, Stuart, became the company's president. The Whitehall Building in downtown Manhattan became the corporation's first headquarters. Global sales increased due to the sales of Wyeth's Kolynos brand of toothpaste. In 1929, Stuart Wyeth died and left controlling interest to Harvard University.

1930–1949
In 1930, Wyeth purchased Anacin, a product for tension headaches which quickly became the company's flagship product. One year later, Harvard sold Wyeth to American Home Products (AHP) for US$2.9 million.

In 1935, Alvin G. Brush, a Certified Public Accountant, became CEO of the organization and served for 30 years. Under Brush's leadership, 34 new companies were acquired in 15 years, including Chef Boyardee and the S.M.A. Corporation, a pharmaceutical firm specializing in infant formulas. Wyeth also made its first licensing deal, acquiring an antibiotic for arthritis vaccine research.

In 1941, the US entered World War II, and AHP shipped typical wartime drugs such as Sulfadiazine, bacteriostatics, blood plasma, typhus vaccine, quinine, and atabrine tablets. Wyeth was later rewarded for its contribution to the war effort. During this time, Wyeth launched its penicillin research facility with G. Raymond Rettew. In 1943, Wyeth purchased G. Washington Coffee Refining Company, an instant coffee company created by George C. L. Washington.

In 1943, AHP merged with Ayerst, McKenna and Harrison, Ltd. of Canada. With this merger came Premarin, the world's first conjugated estrogen medicine, which was a flagship product for AHP until 2002, when preliminary results from the Women's Health Initiative linked it to a number of negative effects, including increased risk for breast cancer. Sales subsequently fell off worldwide.

AHP was one of 22 companies selected by the government in 1944 to manufacture penicillin for the military, and later for the general public.

In 1945, AHP acquired the Fort Dodge Serum Company, entering the animal health field.

In 1946, AHP acquired the Joseph Burnett Co., a manufacturer of flavoring extracts.

1950–1969
In 1951, AHP launched Antabuse, a drug for the treatment of alcoholism, as well as the antihistamine Phenergan. Ansolyen was launched the next year as a high blood pressure medication. The anticonvulsant Mysoline was introduced in 1954. Other drugs introduced during this time include Isordil, a vasodilator for treatment of angina, Dryvax, a freeze-dried smallpox vaccine, and Ovral, a combined oral contraceptive pill. Pharmaceuticals were generating an ever-increasing percentage of AHP's sales.

AHP became a leading US vaccine producer after supplying polio vaccine for Salk trials. The corporate headquarters were moved to Radnor, Pennsylvania, where they remained until 2003. William F. Laporte became the chairman and president of AHP in 1965, and served until 1981.

The World Health Organization initiated the Global Smallpox Eradication Program in 1967, and approached AHP to develop a better injection system for smallpox vaccines which could be used in the field. AHP waived patent royalties on its innovative bifurcated needle, aiding in the delivery of over 200 million smallpox vaccines per year.

1970–1989
AHP's oral contraceptives became popular in the US. John W. Culligan, after becoming chairman and CEO in 1981, spun off less profitable lines and focused resources on consumer and prescription drugs. AHP made history in 1984 with the introduction of Advil, the first nonprescription ibuprofen in America, as well as the most famous prescription-to-OTC switch in history.

John R. Stafford became CEO and chairman in 1986. He completed the divestiture of non-core businesses such as household products (for example the Slaymaker lock company), foods, candy (Brach's Confections), and medical devices (e.g., its Sherwood-Medical Company was sold to Tyco-Kendal in 1997). In 1987 AHP merged its Wyeth and Ayerst divisions to unite its pharmaceutical businesses, forming Wyeth-Ayerst Laboratories.

In the late 1980s, AHP acquired the animal health businesses of Bristol-Myers and Parke-Davis. In negotiations that lasted from 1986 to 1989, AHP acquired A.H. Robins which had been driven into bankruptcy by litigation over the Dalkon Shield, and which also sold Reglan, Robitussin, ChapStick, and Dimetapp, and merging it into its Whitehall unit to establish its Whitehall-Robins Division.

1990–1999
In 1990, Reckitt & Colman (now Reckitt Benckiser) acquired Boyle-Midway from American Home Products. The products included in the deal were Wizard air freshener, Easy-Off oven spray, and Woolite detergent. After a dedication of the food business, the PAM trademark becomes part of American Home Foods.

Premarin became the most prescribed drug in the US in 1993. Effexor (venlafaxine HCl), the first serotonin-noradrenaline reuptake inhibitor (SNRI), is introduced for the treatment of clinical depression and is later indicated for general anxiety disorder and social anxiety disorder.

In 1993, AHP founded the Women's Health Research Institute, the only institute in the pharmaceutical industry entirely dedicated to research in women's health. The institute conducts trials in menopausal issues, endometriosis, contraception, and more.

In 1994, AHP acquired American Cyanamid and its subsidiary Lederle Laboratories. This acquisition brought the Lederle Praxis vaccines, new research and development capacity, and Centrum, the leading US multivitamin. AHP's sales topped US$13 billion in 1995; two years later, Premarin became the company's first brand to reach US$1 billion in sales.

In 1995, AHP acquired the animal health division of Solvay, which was folded into Fort Dodge Animal Health. The acquisition gave Fort Dodge Animal Health strong market presence in Europe and Asia as well as expanding its product portfolio to include swine and poultry vaccines.

In 1996, AHP spun off its food unit as International Home Foods. International Home Foods was purchased by ConAgra Foods in 2000.  AHP also acquired full ownership of Genetics Institute, Inc. after acquiring a majority interest in 1992.

In 1997, the U.S. Food and Drug Administration (FDA) requested that AHP withdraw its controversial diet drug fenfluramine from the market after several reports of death and health problems associated with the drug combination known as fen-phen occurred.

In 1998, British pharmaceutical giant SmithKline Beecham abandoned an estimated $70 billion merger with AHP. The deal was reportedly killed in response to British regulators who feared losing jobs to a proposed US headquarters location. (SmithKline Beecham merged with Glaxo Wellcome in 1999 to form the world's largest drug company.)  In the same year, American Home Products acquired A. H. Robbins Pharmaceuticals.

In 1999, another AHP merger fell through, this time a proposed $34 billion merger-of-equals with chemical and biotech manufacturer Monsanto Company. Though the companies issued a combined statement saying the breakup was mutual "because (the deal) was not in the best interests of shareholders", rumors circulated that AHP had canceled the deal due to issues in the soon-to-be-combined boardroom. (Monsanto announced in December 1999 that it would merge with Pharmacia & Upjohn instead; the new conglomerate eventually unloaded Monsanto again, before being bought themselves by Pfizer in 2003.)

2000–2009
In 2000, American Home Products lost a US$65 billion friendly takeover bid for rival drug company Warner-Lambert. After the merger announcement, Pfizer offered a competing hostile bid, primarily to save its joint venture with Warner over Lipitor (at the time the biggest-selling prescription drug in the world). At one point talks were under way in which Procter & Gamble would help by buying both companies in a wild three-way merger, a rumor which cost P&G a 10% drop in its stock price. Although both CEOs eventually toured the world to defend the deal to the company's shareholders, Pfizer won Warner-Lambert and formed the second largest drug company in the world, while AHP had to settle for a US$1.8 billion poison-pill payment.

In March 2001, Robert Essner was appointed as CEO of AHP, replacing John Stafford.

On March 11, 2002, American Home Products changed its name to Wyeth, having spun off unrelated businesses in order to focus on pharmaceuticals.

As part of the Women's Health Initiative sponsored by the National Institutes of Health, a large-scale clinical trial for hormone replacement therapy showed that long-term use of progestin and estrogen may increase the risk of strokes, heart attacks, blood clots, and breast cancer. Following these results, Wyeth experienced a significant decline in its sales of Premarin, Prempro (conjugated equine estrogens), and related hormones, from over $2 billion in 2002 to just over $1 billion in 2006. The results from the study were significant enough that Wyeth terminated the trials early due to a fear that their participants may be at risk.

Wyeth, as a corporation, filed a "citizens' complaint" with the US FDA on October 16, 2005, requesting that the FDA take action against pharmacies who compound, manufacture, or sell unlicensed Bioidentical hormone replacement therapy (BHRT) drugs to their patients. Specifically, Wyeth asserted that the BHRT drugs are not licensed by the FDA according to section 505 of the Food, Drug and Cosmetic Act, misbranded and adulterated per sections 501 and 502 of 21 U.S.C. (paragraphs 351, 352, and 355). Drug manufacturers are required to demonstrate through clinical trials that marketed drugs are safe and efficacious, a process that BHRT drugs have not undergone. If honored, the request would require the same safety and efficacy data for those primarily engaged in alternative medicine.

The European Commissioner for Health and Consumer Protection blamed the presence of illegal steroids in the food supply on "fraudulent exchange and disposal of pharmaceutical waste". A Wyeth factory disposing of the byproducts from progestin manufacture was the source of the contamination.

In 2003 Wyeth reportedly contributed funds to a not-for-profit support group, The Meningitis Centre, which lobbied the Australian government to introduce universal immunisation against pneumococcal disease. Wyeth produced the only pneumococcal vaccine approved for young children in Australia.

In September 2007, Bernard Poussot was appointed president and chief executive officer effective on January 1, 2008.

During June 2009, an Arkansas federal judge granted public access to evidence that Wyeth Pharmaceuticals "ghostwrote" medical articles regarding its hormone therapy drug Prempro. Along with The New York Times, PLoS Medicine, represented by the law firm Public Justice, had sought to intervene in a court case of women bringing an action in relation to Prempro and other hormone therapy drugs, in order to unseal papers that allegedly showed that Wyeth failed to disclose its role in preparing medical journal articles promoting Prempro and in recruiting academic authors to put their names on the articles for publication—that is that they practised ghost writing.

On January 23, 2009, The Wall Street Journal reported that Pfizer was in talks to buy Wyeth at a cost of US$68 billion. On January 25, Pfizer agreed to the purchase, a deal financed with cash, shares and loans. The deal was completed on October 15, 2009. The purchase was approved by the SEC and went into effect later in 2009, although vestiges of Wyeth remained for another year or two while effects of the acquisition were ironed out.

On October 15, 2009, Pfizer signed the final acquisition papers making Wyeth a wholly owned subsidiary of Pfizer, thus completing the US$68 billion dollar deal.

2012–present
In 2012, Nestlé bought the infant nutrition division of Pfizer and renamed it as Wyeth Nutrition. The Wyeth brand is still owned by Pfizer. In 2020, Wyeth Holdings agreed to settle a claim that stemmed from a lawsuit alleging long term environmental damages by paying $4.2 million to the state of New Jersey.

Subsidiaries

Wyeth Consumer Healthcare
Wyeth Consumer Healthcare (formerly Whitehall-Robins Consumer Healthcare) operated throughout the world. The consumer healthcare division had sales of $2.5 billion in 2004 and was at the time the fifth largest over-the-counter health products company in the world.

Wyeth Pharmaceuticals
Wyeth Pharmaceuticals, formerly Wyeth-Ayerst Laboratories, is the original company founded by the Wyeth brothers, originally known as John Wyeth and Brother. They focused on the research, development, and marketing of prescription drugs. The pharmaceuticals division was further subdivided into five subdivisions: Wyeth Research, Prescription Products, Biotech, Vaccines, and Nutritionals.

Fort Dodge Animal Health
Fort Dodge Animal Health was founded in 1912 by Daniel E. Baughman as "Fort Dodge Serum Company". The company was established in Fort Dodge, Iowa, to manufacture hog cholera serum. It became a division of American Home Products in 1945. It is a leading manufacturer of prescription and over-the-counter veterinary vaccines and pharmaceuticals. Its global headquarters are located in Overland Park, Kansas.

Innovative Fort Dodge products include West Nile-Innovator, Duramune Adult, CYDECTIN Pour-on, the Pyramid vaccine line, Quest Gel, and EtoGesic Tablets.

Products

Wyeth Consumer Healthcare Products

Wyeth Pharmaceuticals Products

Fort Dodge Animal Health Products

Prevnar
Prevnar was approved by the US FDA on February 17, 2000, for the immunization of infants at 2, 4, 6 and 12–15 months of age to prevent invasive pneumococcal disease.

On July 1, 2006, Wyeth launched Prevnar — its international vaccine for Invasive Pneumococcal Disease (IPD) — in India. Prevnar is the only pneumococcal conjugate vaccine for infants and children which protects against pneumococcal disease like meningitis, bacterial pneumonia, septicaemia and bacteraemia (bacteria in the blood.)

Rapamune
A "whistleblower suit" was filed against Wyeth in 2005 alleging that the company illegally marketed their drug Rapamune. Wyeth is targeted in the suit for off-label marketing, targeting specific doctors and medical facilities to increased sales of Rapamune, trying to get current transplant patients to change from their current transplant drugs to Rapamune and for specifically targeting African-Americans. According to the whistleblowers, Wyeth also provided doctors and hospitals with kickbacks to prescribe the drug in the form of grants, donations and other money. A US House of Representatives committee, led by Rep. Edolphus Towns is investigating Wyeth for these abuses.

Prempro
Wyeth was sued for its marketing of Prempro, a hormone replacement therapy, which was implicated in the cancers of 14,000 patients. Wyeth was particularly criticised by observers for its use of 'ghostwriters' to put their names to research papers that Wyeth had paid a third party, DesignWrite, to prepare.

Dexfenfluramine ("Fen-Phen")

The drug combination fenfluramine/phentermine, usually called "fen-phen," was an anti-obesity treatment. Fenfluramine was marketed by Wyeth as Pondimin, but was shown to cause potentially fatal pulmonary hypertension and heart valve problems.

References

External links
 Wyethnutrition.com

 
Pfizer
Multinational companies headquartered in the United States
Pharmaceutical companies based in New Jersey
Defunct companies based in New Jersey
Companies based in Morris County, New Jersey
Madison, New Jersey
Vaccine producers
Companies formerly listed on the New York Stock Exchange
Pharmaceutical companies established in 1860
Pharmaceutical companies disestablished in 2009
Biotechnology companies disestablished in 2009
1860 establishments in Pennsylvania
2009 disestablishments in New Jersey
2009 mergers and acquisitions